Bellona Island is an island of the Rennell and Bellona Province, in the Solomon Islands.

Population
Bellona Island is densely populated and its interior is lush and fertile. There are three districts namely Matangi, Ghongau and Ngango. Each district has manaha (tribes) except for Ghongau district, which has two sub-districts; Nguutuanga Bangitakungu and Ngutuanga Bangika'ango. There are many villages on Bellona Island:
Matahenua/Matamoana (west)
Honga'ubea
Tongomainge
Ngotokanaba
Pauta
Ngongona
Gongau
Ahenoa
Matangi
NukuTonga (East)

Bellona Island is, like Rennell Island, a Polynesian-inhabited island within the Solomons, where most of the islands are primarily Melanesian with a few Micronesian island provinces. It is thus counted among the Polynesian outliers. The nearby Bellona Shoals were the site of several shipwrecks. On the western end of the island there were sacred stone-gods, at a place called Ngabenga- west Bellona. The stone-gods were destroyed by Seventh-day Adventist missionaries in 1938. This island was named at the beginning of the 19th century after Capt. Lord Rennell's ship Bellona. However, its original name is Mungiki.

See also
Polynesian outliers
British Solomon Islands

Literature
Subsistence on Bellona Island (Mungiki): A Study of the Cultural Ecology of a Polynesian Outlier in the British Solomon Islands Protectorate by Sofus Christiansen. Publisher: Aarhus University Press, Pub. Date: January 1975,

References

External links
 pictures
 Cultural Ecology
 Beliefs and Rites of Pre-Christian Bellona
 Map of Bellona Island
 Bellona Travel Guide

Rennell and Bellona Islands
Polynesian outliers